Africa's Next Top Model is a reality television show and spin-off to America's Next Top Model. It follows the format of the original version, and documents a competition in which a number of aspiring models compete for the title of Africa's Next Top Model and a chance to start a career in the modeling industry. The show is hosted by model Oluchi Onweagba, and features contestants from countries in Africa.

The first season ("cycle") aired on Africa Magic from November 2013 to January 2014. The winner of the competition was 20-year-old Aamito Lagum, who represented Uganda.

Controversy

West Africa's Next Top Model

In 2008, a similar adaptation titled West Africa's Next Top Model was planned and would have featured contestants originating from the West African countries of Côte d'Ivoire, Ghana, Sierra Leone, Senegal, Liberia and Nigeria. The competition was also supposed to be hosted by Oluchi Onweagba. Auditions began in March 2009, but due to unknown reasons, the series was left without a station and never aired, and no contestants were selected. On 12 February 2016, a federal high court in Abuja dismissed preliminary objections regarding a ₦780 billion copyright lawsuit by Chudi Charles, CEO of International Pageant and Films, against Onweagba for infringing his West Africa's Next Top Model trademark, which he had registered in 2003; After filing the lawsuit against Onweagba, as well as the Nigerian Copyright Commission, Etisalat Nigeria, Guinness Nigeria Plc, Mtech, Multichoice Nigeria and CBS, Onweagba and the other defendants filed an objection in which they argued that they had obtained the rights to host Africa's Next Top Model from Tyra Banks, the executive producer and host of America's Next Top Model. The objection was dismissed after the defendants were unable to produce a superior title to back up their claims of ownership.

Judges

Cycles

Contestants per country 

Bold text indicates winners
Italic text indicates runners-up

References

External links
 Official website 

Top Model
2013 television series debuts
2014 television series endings
English-language television shows
Non-American television series based on American television series